Constantine (died in 1587) was a Georgian royal prince (batonishvili) of the Bagrationi dynasty of Imereti.

Constantine was a son of King Bagrat III of Imereti and brother of King George II of Imereti. He was opposed to his brother, George, who had him and his son Rostom cast in prison in 1583. After the death of George in 1585, Constantine attempted to disinherit George's young heir, Levan and seized the territory east of the Rioni River, including Skanda, Katskhi, and Argueti. Levan was able to reclaim these areas in 1587, but he had to buy peace by granting to his uncle a princely estate in Argueti.

Constantine was married to Elene (died 1605), daughter of Rostom Gurieli, Prince of Guria. He had three sons:

Rostom of Imereti (1571–1605), King of Imereti (1590–1605).
George III of Imereti (died 1639), King of Imereti (1605–1639).
 Prince Simon (fl. 1603).

References

1587 deaths
Bagrationi dynasty of the Kingdom of Imereti
Georgian princes
Year of birth unknown